Paula Anne Gruber (born 30 November 1974) is a New Zealand former cricketer who played as a right-arm off break bowler. She appeared in 2 One Day Internationals for New Zealand in 2000. She played domestic cricket for Central Districts and Auckland.

In 2011 Gruber was awarded Women's Bowler of the Year at the Auckland Cricket Awards.

References

External links

Living people
1974 births
People from Waiouru
New Zealand women cricketers
New Zealand women One Day International cricketers
Central Districts Hinds cricketers
Auckland Hearts cricketers